Major facilitator superfamily domain containing 1 (MFSD1, SMAP) is a protein belonging to the MFS Pfam clan. It is an Atypical solute carrier.

It belongs to the major facilitator superfamily MFS Pfam Clan. MFSD1 has been identified in neuronal plasma membranes  and lysosomes.

HGNC:25874

MFSD1 belongs to AMTF6.

References 

Protein superfamilies
Transmembrane proteins